Now That's What I Call Music! 3 may refer to at least four different Now That's What I Call Music!-series albums, including
 Now That's What I Call Music 3 (original UK series, 1984 release)
 Now That's What I Call Music! 3 (US series, 1999 release) 
 Now That's What I Call Music! 3 (Asia series, 1997 release)
 Now That's What I Call Music! 3 (Norwegian series, 2010 release)